Bryn Roberts (7 April 1897 – 26 August 1964) was a Welsh trade union leader.

Roberts grew up in Abertillery, leaving school at the age of thirteen to work at a colliery.  He joined the South Wales Miners' Federation (SWMF), and won a union scholarship to attend the Central Labour College in 1919.  Two years later, he returned to Wales and was elected as checkweighman for Rhymney, then worked full-time for the union as its agent for Rhymney Valley and sat on its executive.  He was also elected as a local councillor for the Labour Party. In 1929 he finished second behind Aneurin Bevan in the contest to find a Labour candidate for the Ebbw Vale constituency.

In 1934, Roberts left the SWMF to become General Secretary of the National Union of Public Employees (NUPE).  He represented the union at the Trades Union Congress (TUC), and was the TUC's representative to the American Federation of Labour in 1942.  In 1954, he was part of a joint trade union and Parliamentary delegation to China.

Roberts retired in 1962 due to increasingly poor health, and died two years later.

References

1897 births
1964 deaths
General Secretaries of the National Union of Public Employees
People from Abertillery
Welsh trade unionists